Russell Morrison Shearman (April 27, 1908 – May 5, 1956) was an American special effects artist.

He won a Technical Achievement Award at the 19th Academy Awards in 1946 along with Marty  Martin and Jack Lannan of the RKO Radio Studio Special Effects Dept. for the development of a new method of simulating falling snow on motion picture sets for It's a Wonderful Life. The film won just the one Academy Award, in the Technical Achievement category for developing a new method of creating artificial snow.

Before It's a Wonderful Life, fake movie snow was mostly made from cornflakes painted white and it was so loud when stepped on that any snow-filled scenes with dialogue had to be re-dubbed afterwards. RKO studio's head of special effects, Russell Sherman, developed a new compound, utilizing water, soap flakes, foamite and sugar.

He won an Academy Award during the 21st Academy Awards for Best Special Effects. He won for the film Portrait of Jennie. He shared his win with Paul Eagler, Charles L. Freeman, Joseph McMillan Johnson, Clarence Slifer and James G. Stewart.

Filmography

The Sharkfighters (1956)
The Kentuckian (1955)
Beachhead (1954)
Vera Cruz (1954)
The Yellow Tomahawk (1954)
The Diamond Queen (1953)
Bwana Devil (1952)
The Crimson Pirate (1952)
Hans Christian Andersen (1952)
Portrait of Jennie (1948)
It's a Wonderful Life (1946)

Death
According to an entry in a shark attack database (attributed to the Australian surgeon and shark attack enthusiast Sir Victor Coppleson), Russell Shearman allegedly died from a shark attack while filming underwater scenes for The Sharkfighters in the Caribbean Sea off Cuba. However, his obituary in the Los Angeles Times states that he died by electrocution while repairing equipment.

References

External links

Best Visual Effects Academy Award winners
Academy Award for Technical Achievement winners
1908 births
1956 deaths
Special effects people
Deaths due to shark attacks
Burials at Forest Lawn Memorial Park (Hollywood Hills)